Francesco Gavazzi (born 1 August 1984) is an Italian professional road bicycle racer, who currently rides for UCI ProTeam .

Career
Gavazzi was born in Morbegno. In 2012, Gavazzi participated in the Tour of Beijing and won its queen stage leading to the Great Wall of China. To add to the difficulty of the day, the air quality was deemed as "severely polluted" by the local authorities. Gavazzi closed down an attack by 's Edvald Boasson Hagen and grabbed the victory. His consistent placings in the other stages netted him the second spot in the overall classification behind Tony Martin.

Major results

2004
 10th Trofeo Alcide Degasperi
2005
 6th Trofeo Banca Popolare di Vicenza
2006
 1st  Road race, National Under-23 Road Championships
 1st  Overall Giro della Toscana
 1st Trofeo Unidelta
 1st Giro del Canavese
 2nd GP Folignano
 3rd  Road race, UEC European Under-23 Road Championships
 4th Road race, UCI Under-23 Road World Championships
 5th Overall Girobio
1st Stage 4
 5th Gran Premio Palio del Recioto
 5th Trofeo Alcide Degasperi
 6th Coppa della Pace
 7th Trofeo Banca Popolare di Vicenza
2007
 3rd Japan Cup
2008
 5th Overall Tour de Pologne
 5th Japan Cup
 7th Gran Premio Nobili Rubinetterie
 7th Memorial Marco Pantani
 9th Memorial Cimurri
2009
 1st Rund um die Nürnberger Altstadt
 2nd Gran Premio Industria e Commercio di Prato
 3rd Giro della Romagna
 3rd Giro del Piemonte
 4th Road race, National Road Championships
 5th Giro di Toscana
 6th Paris–Tours
 10th Overall Tour de Pologne
 10th Overall Eneco Tour
2010
 1st Coppa Ugo Agostoni
 1st Stage 1 Giro di Sardegna
 1st Stage 3 Tour of the Basque Country
 2nd Trofeo Laigueglia
 6th Classica Sarda
 8th Giro del Friuli
 8th GP Ouest–France
 9th Tre Valli Varesine
 9th Giro della Romagna
 9th Grand Prix Cycliste de Montréal
 10th Overall Tirreno–Adriatico
2011
 Volta a Portugal
1st Stages 6 & 10
 1st Stage 18 Vuelta a España
 1st Stage 5 Tour of the Basque Country
 4th Classica Sarda
 4th Gran Premio Nobili Rubinetterie
 6th Overall Giro della Provincia di Reggio Calabria
 8th Gran Premio della Costa Etruschi
2012
 2nd Overall Tour of Beijing
1st Stage 3
 5th Trofeo Laigueglia
 5th Druivenkoers Overijse
 7th Overall Tour Méditerranéen
2013
 6th Overall Tour of Belgium
2014
 3rd Trofeo Serra de Tramuntana
 5th Trofeo Muro–Port d'Alcúdia
 8th Grand Prix of Aargau Canton
 10th Gran Premio Città di Camaiore
2015
 2nd Trofeo Laigueglia
 2nd Gran Premio di Lugano
 4th Overall Tour of Hainan
 10th Tre Valli Varesine
2016
 1st Memorial Marco Pantani
 1st Stage 2 Volta a Portugal
 2nd Overall Sibiu Cycling Tour
 2nd Gran Premio della Costa Etruschi
 2nd Giro dell'Appennino
 3rd Tre Valli Varesine
 3rd Coppa Ugo Agostoni
 5th Trofeo Laigueglia
 5th GP Industria & Artigianato di Larciano
 7th Overall Tour du Haut Var
 8th Overall Tour du Limousin
 8th Coppa Sabatini
 9th Overall Tour La Provence
 10th Trofeo Matteotti
 10th Gran Premio Bruno Beghelli
2017
 3rd Overall Tour du Limousin
 3rd Gran Premio della Costa Etruschi
 3rd Classic Sud-Ardèche
 3rd Coppa Ugo Agostoni
 3rd Coppa Sabatini
 6th La Drôme Classic
 6th Trofeo Laigueglia
 7th Overall Tour of Turkey
 7th GP Industria & Artigianato di Larciano
 7th Memorial Marco Pantani
2018
 1st Stage 1 Vuelta a Burgos
 2nd Grand Prix of Aargau Canton
 3rd Memorial Marco Pantani
 4th Giro dell'Appennino
 5th Overall Tour du Limousin
 5th Trofeo Laigueglia
 6th Coppa Sabatini
 9th GP Industria & Artigianato di Larciano
 10th Coppa Ugo Agostoni
2019
 1st Stage 4 Tour du Limousin
 4th Trofeo Laigueglia
 7th Memorial Marco Pantani
 9th Giro dell'Appennino

Grand Tour general classification results timeline

References

External links

Profile at Lampre-NGC official website

Italian male cyclists
1984 births
Living people
Cyclists from the Province of Sondrio
Italian Vuelta a España stage winners